Evans Cove is a cove in Terra Nova Bay, Victoria Land, entered between Inexpressible Island and Cape Russell. It was first charted by the British Antarctic Expedition, 1907–09, and was probably named by Ernest Shackleton for Captain Frederick Pryce Evans, master of the ship Koonya, which towed the Nimrod south in 1907, and later master of the Nimrod during the last year of the expedition.

References 

Coves of Antarctica
Landforms of Victoria Land
Scott Coast